Serixia phaeoptera is a species of beetle in the family Cerambycidae. It was described by Per Olof Christopher Aurivillius in 1927.

Subspecies
 Serixia phaeoptera phaeoptera Aurivillius, 1927
 Serixia phaeoptera giloloensis Breuning, 1958

References

Serixia
Beetles described in 1927